Ur Mendoza Jaddou (born 1974) is an American attorney who is the current director of United States Citizenship and Immigration Services in the Department of Homeland Security.

Early life and education

Jaddou was born and raised in Chula Vista, California. Her mother is from Mexico and her father is from Iraq, of Chaldean heritage. Jaddou earned a Bachelor of Arts and Master of Arts in philosophy from Stanford University and a Juris Doctor from the UCLA School of Law.

Career 

From 2002 to 2007, Jaddou was senior counsel to Congresswoman Zoe Lofgren. From 2007 to 2011, she was majority chief counsel to the United States House Judiciary Subcommittee on Immigration and Citizenship. From 2012 to 2014, she was deputy assistant secretary of the Bureau of Legislative Affairs for regional, global, and functional affairs. Jaddou then joined the United States Department of Homeland Security, serving as chief counsel for Citizenship and Immigration Services. Since 2017, Jaddou has also been an adjunct law professor at the Washington College of Law. Since 2018, Jaddou has been the director of DHS Watch, a watchdog group operated by America's Voice.

Nomination as director of USCIS 

On April 12, 2021, President Joe Biden announced his intent to nominate Jaddou to be the director of the United States Citizenship and Immigration Services. On April 15, 2021, her nomination was sent to the Senate.  The Senate confirmed her, by a vote of 47 to 34, on July 30, 2021.

Leadership of USCIS 

Under Jaddou, USCIS changed its mission statement in February 2022 to include words like "welcome" and "respect" for immigrants, after the Trump administration moved to emphasize that the agency's work included "securing the homeland." The Trump administration also had removed the phrase, "nation of immigrants," from the agency's mission statement, prompting backlash from immigrant rights groups, but Jaddou did not restore the phrase.

Jaddou has called for USCIS to hire thousands of additional staff to address record case backlogs. She testified in Congress in April 2022 that the agency was still dealing with vacancies and morale problems experienced during the Trump administration.

References 

1974 births
Biden administration personnel
Living people
People from Chula Vista, California
Stanford University alumni
UCLA School of Law alumni
Washington College of Law faculty
United States Department of Homeland Security officials
American people of Iraqi descent
American people of Mexican descent
Catholics from California
Middle Eastern Christians
Chaldean Americans